Hoax is a 2019 American horror film directed by Matt Allen, starring Cheryl Texiera, Ben Browder and Hutch Dano.

Plot

Cast
 Cheryl Texiera as Dr. Ellen Freese
 Ben Browder as Rick Paxton
 Hutch Dano as Justin Johnson
 Brian Thompson as John Singer
 Schuyler Denham as Peter Moore
 Adrienne Barbeau as Wilma
 Shoshana Bush as Brigette Powers
 Max Decker as Cooper Barnes

Release
The film was released on Google Play, iTunes, Amazon Prime Video, Vudu, and on Blu-ray on 20 August 2019.

Reception
The film received a positive review in PopHorror. Adrian Halen of HorrorNews.net wrote the film a mixed review, praising the film's third act. Film critic Kim Newman wrote a negative review of the film, writing that it "isn’t as memorable a visit to this much-tramped patch of the woods as, say, Abominable, Exists or Willow Creek", while praising the performances.

Ian Sedensky of Culture Crypt gave the film a score of 45 out of 100. Bryan Yentz of Rue Morgue wrote the film a negative review, writing that it "attempts some respectable misdirection, but falters in its lusterless execution."

References

External links
 
 

American horror films
2019 horror films